Sting: The Secret Operations, also known as Sting: Secret Operations or Sting Online and abbreviated to Sting (Korean:스팅, Japanese release name: Code Name Sting, USA and Philippine release name: K.O.S: Secret Operations) is an online first-person shooter that is being developed by YNK Games and YNK Korea, and distributed by YNK Interactive. It is the first first-person shooter game using the Source Engine in Korea.

2008 video games
First-person shooter multiplayer online games
Freeware games
Multiplayer video games
Source (game engine) games
Video games developed in South Korea
Windows games
Windows-only games